Drasteria saisani is a moth of the family Erebidae. It is found in Crimea and in southern Russia, Armenia, Kazakhstan, Uzbekistan, Kyrgyzstan, Tadjikistan, Turkmenistan, Daghestan, Turkey, Iran, Afghanistan, Pakistan and China.

The wingspan is 28–30 mm. Adults are on wing from April to August.

References

Drasteria
Moths described in 1882
Moths of Asia